List of aerial victories of Heinrich Gontermann
 
Heinrich Gontermann was a German fighter ace during World War I. He was credited with 17 confirmed aerial victories flying with Jagdstaffel 5 before being appointed to command Jagdstaffel 15. While leading this fighter squadron, he shot down a further 22 enemy aircraft. As one of the few pilots daring enough to undertake the highly hazardous assaults on opposing observation balloons, he destroyed 18 of them. Included in this victory list was the notable and unique feat of downing four balloons in three minutes on 19 August 1917.

As the primary arena for aerial combat on the Western Front was over the German trenches and rear works, German aerial and ground observers could usually verify German victories in considerable detail. Aviation historians cited have further researched the war's victory claims, using archives from all sides.

Confirmed victories in this list are numbered and listed chronologically.

This list is complete for entries, though obviously not for all details. Abbreviations from sources utilized were expanded by editor creating this list. Sources: Norman Franks, Frank Bailey, Russell Guest (1993). Above the Lines: The Aces and Fighter Units of the German Air Service, Naval Air Service and Flanders Marine Corps, 1914–1918. Grub Street Publishing, London.

Headnote 

Aerial victories of Gontermann, Heinrich
Gontermann, Heinrich